Anse-à-Veau is a commune in the Anse-à-Veau Arrondissement, in the Nippes department of Haiti. The postal code is HT 7510.

In the aftermath of the 2010 Haiti earthquake, Anse-a-Veau was swollen by refugees from the afflicted areas. Aid to the community after the quake have been airdropped. As of 12 March 2010, 6 weeks after the quake, RFA Largs Bay arrived off the coast and made a large aid drop.

References

Populated places in Nippes
Communes of Haiti